Panaorus albomaculatus is a species of dirt-colored seed bug in the family Rhyparochromidae, found in eastern Asia.

References

External links

 

Rhyparochromidae